Captain Walter Durant Gibbs, 4th Baron Aldenham, 2nd Baron Hunsdon of Hunsdon (11 August 1888 – 30 May 1969), was a British peer, the son of Herbert Cokayne Gibbs, 1st Baron Hunsdon of Hunsdon. He succeeded to the title 2nd Baron Hunsdon on 22 May 1935. He succeeded to the title 4th Baron Aldenham on 21 March 1939, on the death of his cousin, the 3rd Baron, who died without male issue. He served in the Hertfordshire Yeomanry.

He married Beatrix Elinor Paul (1890–1978), on 6 November 1919. Lady Aldenham had a daughter, Theresa, and a son, Charles, from her first marriage to Algernon Villiers, son of Francis Hyde Villiers.

They had two sons together:
Captain Vicary Paul Gibbs (1921–1944) m. Jean Hambro
Anthony Durant Gibbs, 5th Baron Aldenham (1922–1986)

References

1888 births
1969 deaths
British Army personnel of World War I
Hertfordshire Yeomanry officers
Walter
Walter
2